Endless Pain is the debut studio album by German thrash metal band Kreator, released on 1 October, 1985 by Noise Records.

The album combines elements of black metal and thrash metal, ultimately creating a black-metal influenced thrash sound inspired by bands like Venom, Mercyful Fate, and Bathory. 

On this album both Petrozza and Reil share vocal duties.

Track listings

Personnel
Kreator
 Mille Petrozza – guitars, vocals (2, 4, 6, 8, 10)
 Rob Fioretti – bass
 Jürgen "Ventor" Reil – drums, vocals (1, 3, 5, 7, 9)

Production
 Horst Müller – producer, engineer, mixing
 Mille Petrozza, Jürgen Crasser – mastering
 Phil Lawvere – artwork
 Karl-Ulrich Walterbach – executive producer

2017 re-release
 Jan Meininghaus, Thomas Ewerhard  – art, design
 Andy Pearce, Matt Wortham – mastering
 Malcolm Dome – sleeve notes

References

External links
Kreator Terrorzone: Endless Pain

Kreator albums
1985 debut albums
Noise Records albums